In Ribbons is the second studio album by English alternative rock band Pale Saints, released on 23 March 1992 by 4AD. It peaked at number 61 on the UK Albums Chart.

Critical reception

Jack Rabid of Trouser Press called In Ribbons "alluring and attractive, rich in complexity and raw emotion." Martin C. Strong wrote that "the subtlety of its shredding chords and sporadic sonic dreamscapes were let loose all over the shop." MusicHound Rock: The Essential Album Guide wrote that the album "immaculately balances wide-screen guitars and soft melodies."

Spin included In Ribbons in a 2007 list of "essential" shoegaze albums. In 2016, Pitchfork ranked In Ribbons at number 34 on its list of the 50 best shoegaze albums of all time.

Track listing

Personnel
Credits are adapted from the album's liner notes.

 Pale Saints (Meriel Barham, Chris Cooper, Ian Masters, and Graeme Naysmith) – all instruments (except cello), arrangement

Additional musicians
 Hugh Jones – arrangement
 Caroline Lavelle – cello

Production
 Phil Ault – engineering
 Goetz Botzenhardt – engineering
 Alan Branch – engineering
 Steve Bray – engineering
 Kevin Hurley – engineering
 Hugh Jones – production, engineering
 John O'Donnell – engineering
 Paul Tipler – engineering

Design
 Chris Bigg – sleeve design
 Matt Heslop – portrait photography
 Vaughan Oliver – sleeve design
 Pirate – model making
 Kevin Westenberg – still life photography

Charts

References

External links
 

1992 albums
Pale Saints albums
Albums produced by Hugh Jones (producer)
4AD albums